Haut-Sheila was a local service district in Gloucester County, New Brunswick, centred around the settlement of Upper Sheila.  It was incorporated into the Regional Municipality of Grand Tracadie–Sheila.

History

Notable people

See also
List of neighbourhoods in New Brunswick

References
 

Designated places in New Brunswick
Former municipalities in New Brunswick
Neighbourhoods in Grand Tracadie-Sheila